United Nations Security Council Resolution 268, adopted on July 28, 1969, after hearing statements by the parties involved, the Council strongly censured Portugal for attacks on in Katete in eastern Zambia.  The Council called upon Portugal to desist from violating the territorial integrity of and carrying out unprovoked raids against Zambia.  The Council demanded the Portuguese military return all civilians kidnapped and all property taken declaring that if Portugal failed to comply they would meet to consider further measures.

Resolution 268 was adopted by 11 votes to none, while France, Spain, the United Kingdom and United States abstained.

See also
 List of United Nations Security Council Resolutions 201 to 300 (1965–1971)

References 
Text of the Resolution at undocs.org

External links
 

 0268
20th century in Portugal
 0268
 0268
 0268
Portuguese Mozambique
July 1969 events
Portugal–Zambia relations